Lost in America is a 1985 American satirical road comedy film directed by Albert Brooks and co-written by Brooks with Monica Johnson. The film stars Brooks alongside Julie Hagerty as a married couple who decide to quit their jobs and travel across America.

Plot
David and Linda Howard are typical 1980s yuppies in Los Angeles, California, dissatisfied with their bourgeois lifestyle. He works in an advertising agency and she for a department store, but after failing to receive an expected promotion and instead being asked to transfer to the firm's New York office, David angrily insults his boss and is fired. David coaxes his wife to quit her job as well and seek a new adventure.

The Howards decide to sell their house, liquidate their assets, drop out of society, "like in Easy Rider", and travel the country in a Winnebago recreational vehicle. They leave LA with US$100,000 but their plans change drastically when Linda loses all their savings playing roulette at the Desert Inn Casino in Las Vegas, where David desperately and unsuccessfully persuades a casino manager to give the money back as a publicity gimmick.

With nowhere to go, the couple quarrels at Hoover Dam, eventually arriving in small-town Safford, Arizona. David unsuccessfully applies for a delivery job at a local pharmacy and resorts to an employment agency. After a counselor obnoxiously reminds him that he was fired from his high-paying job in advertising, David accepts the best position available — as a crossing guard, taunted by local schoolchildren. Linda, meanwhile, finds employment as the assistant manager at the local Der Wienerschnitzel, working under a person half her age.

Only a few days after beginning their pursuit of the dream of dropping out of society, David and Linda are living in a trailer park, nearly broke, and working dead-end jobs where they are accountable to brats. They decide that it is better to return to their old lifestyle as soon as possible. They point the Winnebago toward New York, where David begs for his old job back. An end card reveals he is rehired with a substantial pay cut but better dental care.

Cast
 Albert Brooks as David Howard
 Julie Hagerty as Linda Howard
 Maggie Roswell as Patty
 Michael Greene as Paul Dunn
 Garry Marshall as Casino Manager
 Donald Gibb as Ex-Convict
 Charles Boswell as Highway Patrolman

Brooks originally did not want to direct himself and had wanted Bill Murray for the part of David Howard.

Reception and awards
Lost In America received mostly positive reviews from critics and holds a 95% rating on review aggregator Rotten Tomatoes, based on 39 reviews. The site's consensus states: "A satire of the American fantasy of leaving it all behind, Lost in America features some of Albert Brooks' best, most consistent writing and cultural jabs." The film was a commercial success, though not a blockbuster. The film's script won the National Society of Film Critics award for Best Screenplay.

Film critic Roger Ebert gave it 4 out of 4 stars calling it observant and very funny.

The film is #80 on Bravo's 100 Funniest Movies, and was listed at #84 on American Film Institute's AFI's 100 Years...100 Laughs in 2000.

Home media

Warner Home Video initially released the film on Betamax, VHS, and Laserdisc in 1985 and reissued it twice on videotape, in 1991 and 1997. The film made its DVD debut on April 3, 2001, and was made available for streaming on Netflix on July 1, 2016. Criterion released the Blu-ray on July 25, 2017.

See also
 List of films set in Las Vegas

References

External links

1985 films
American comedy road movies
1980s comedy road movies
Films directed by Albert Brooks
Films set in the Las Vegas Valley
Films set in Los Angeles
Films set in New York City
Films about gambling
The Geffen Film Company films
Films with screenplays by Albert Brooks
Films with screenplays by Monica Johnson
Films scored by Arthur B. Rubinstein
1985 comedy films
1980s English-language films
1980s American films